Typisch Sophie is a German legal drama television series. The series premiered in Germany in October 2004 and ran for two seasons before being cancelled due to low TV ratings in 2006.

Content 
Sophie Andersen is a single mom and has been working as a secretary for the last few years. When her company goes bankrupt she decides to take a new challenge and apply at a law office.

See also
List of German television series

External links
 

2004 German television series debuts
2006 German television series endings
German-language television shows
Sat.1 original programming
German legal television series